The Nikon SP is a professional level, interchangeable lens, 35 mm film, rangefinder camera introduced in 1957. It is the culmination of Nikon's rangefinder development which started in 1948 with the Nikon I, and was "arguably the most advanced  rangefinder of its time." It was manufactured by the Japanese optics company Nippon Kogaku K. K. (Nikon Corporation since 1988). Three other lower featured rangefinder models were subsequently produced on the SP frame, and production continued into the 1960s, but further development of Nikon's professional rangefinders ended with the introduction and success of the single lens reflex Nikon F in 1959.

In 2005 2,500 models of a repro model were manufactured under the name of "Nikon SP Limited Edition". The camera was exclusively sold in Japan and came with a (modern multi-coated) W-Nikkor 3.5 cm f/1.8 lens.

Features

The Nikon SP has dual viewfinders providing frame lines for a total of six focal lengths. The main viewfinder has 1x magnification and has frame lines for 50 mm, 85 mm, 105 mm and 135 mm (selected by rotating a dial under the rewind crank). The frames are parallax-corrected and the focusing patch appears in the centre of the viewfinder. A separate, smaller viewfinder (less than life size) to the left of the main viewfinder has non-parallax corrected frame lines for 35 mm. The entire window acts as a frame for 28 mm lenses.

The camera uses Nikon's 'S' bayonet lens mount which is a modified Contax 'C' bayonet and Contax 'C' lenses are physically compatible but do not accurately focus with the built-in rangefinder. In common with Contax, a small toothed wheel in front of the shutter release is used to focus lenses that use the internal bayonet.

The camera does not have a flash sync on its hot shoe. Instead a pc sync socket is provided. The shutter on early models is a horizontally running mechanically timed rubberized silk fabric curtain. In 1959 the shutter curtain was changed to titanium similar to the Nikon F.

The camera will advance film at a rate of 3 FPS with an added S-36 motor drive. This made the SP the first rangefinder to have motorized film advance.

The Nikon F SLR of 1959 has many structural similarities to the SP from which it evolved with the addition of a reflex mirror and interchangeable pentaprism viewfinder.

Specifications
 Shutter: Horizontal running rubberized silk fabric curtain type focal plain shutter
 Shutter speeds: T, B and 1, 1/2, 1/4, 1/8, 1/15, 1/30, 1/60, 1/125, 1/250, 1/500 and 1/1000 seconds (regular interval graduation)
 Range marker: M inscription (XXINF – 0.9)
 Self-timer: Connect time variable system (the graduation of 3, 6 and 10 seconds it is attached)
 Pc socket: Time lag variable system, it aligns the synchronizer socket attachment and the speed light/write in 1/60 seconds less than
 Finder: Rangefinder type fixed 1x magnification finder (wide angle finder for 28 mm and 35 mm finder)
 Framelines: Auxiliary window: 28 mm, 35 mm; Main window (parallax corrected): 50 mm, 85 mm, 105 mm and 135 mm
 Film wind: Hand operated lever system, 136 degree revolution (multiple winds possible), with 15 degree extra withdrawal angles
 Film rewind: Manual Crank system
 Film: 135 Film (35 mm film) with 36 mm × 24 mm image size

In popular culture
The camera is seen in the background, casually slung from the hand of Bob Neuwirth in Daniel Kramer's portrait of Bob Dylan that is the over image of his "Highway 61 Revisited" of 1965.

See also
Nikon
Nikon F
Nikon S3

References

External links

 Nikon SP
 Nikon SP Limited Edition, by Nikon
 Nikon Rangefinder Cameras, by Nikon

S
S